Barney's Magical Musical Adventure is a Barney & Friends direct-to-video feature.

Plot
Barney's friends are playing in Derek's backyard building a sand castle, after which Barney appears and takes them to a magical forest. They meet an elf named Twinkle, who likes to play games and make new friends. She shows them the road to the castle where they ride pretend horses and meet a real king. After taking care of the castle while the king goes fishing, the kids are made princes and princesses of the kingdom.

Cast
 Barney (voice) - Bob West
 Barney (costume) - David Joyner
 Baby Bop (voice) - Julie Johnson
 Baby Bop (costume) - Jenny Dempsey
 Michael - Brian Eppes
 Tina - Jessica Zucha
 Min - Pia Manalo
 Derek - Rickey Carter
 Twinkle the Elf - Margaret Pyeatt
 Royal King - Rick Wetzel

Songs
 Barney Theme Song (Tune: Yankee Doodle)
 The Noble Duke of York (Tune: The Grand Old Duke of York)
 Castles So High
 Castles So High (Reprise)
 Silly Sounds
 Looby-loo
 Go Round and Round the Village
 If I Had One Wish (Tune: Polly Wolly Doodle)
 Old King Cole
 Polly Put the Kettle On
 Little Jack Horner
 The Muffin Man
 Pat-a-cake, pat-a-cake, baker's man
 Pease Porridge Hot
 Sing a Song of Sixpence
 I am a Fine Musician
 It's Good to be Home (Tune: Castles So High)
 I Love You (Tune: This Old Man)

American children's films
Barney & Friends
PBS original programming
1993 films
Films based on television series
Mattel Creations films
1990s English-language films
1990s American films